Davis Kopi (born 1 December 1971) is a Botswana former footballer who played as a defender. He won two caps for the Botswana national football team in 2000.

External links
 

Association football defenders
Botswana footballers
Botswana international footballers
1971 births
Living people
TAFIC F.C. players